D-sharp or D may refer to:
The musical pitch D♯
D-sharp major musical scale
D-sharp minor musical scale

See also
DSharp (born 1988), violinist